Zinovy Petrovich Rozhestvensky (tr. ;  – January 14, 1909) was an admiral of the Imperial Russian Navy.  He was in command of the Second Pacific Squadron in the Battle of Tsushima, during the Russo-Japanese War.

Under Admiral Rozhestvensky's command, the Russian navy holds the record of steaming an all-steel, coal-powered battleship fleet over  one way to engage an enemy in decisive battle (Battle of Tsushima), selecting , one of four brand-new battleships of the French-designed , as his flagship for the voyage to the Pacific.

Early naval career
Rozhestvensky was the son of a physician from St Petersburg, and joined the Imperial Russian Navy at the age of 17. He graduated from the Sea Cadet Corps, where he mastered English and French, in 1868, and the Mikhailovsky Artillery Academy in 1873. He initially served with the Baltic Fleet as a gunnery officer. In 1876 he transferred to the Black Sea Fleet.

During the Russo-Turkish War Rozhestvensky served on board the gunboat . On June 10, 1877, six torpedo boats, five of which were armed with spar torpedoes, attempted to attack four ironclads of the Ottoman Navy  at Sulina. Rozhestvensky volunteered to lead the first attack against the Turkish warships but his torpedo boat became caught up in the rope boom defenses that protected the enemy ships. The attack was beaten back by Turkish gunfire which destroyed one torpedo boat and the remaining boats withdrew, leaving the enemy ironclads intact.  In July 1877 while still assigned to Vesta, he engaged and damaged an Ottoman battleship, in a five-hour battle. Rozhestvensky was awarded the Order of Saint Vladimir and Order of St George for this action and was promoted to lieutenant commander. However, after the war he revealed in a newspaper article that he had falsified his reports, and that the overloaded Feth-i Bülend escaped with only minor damage. This revelation had no adverse impact on his career.
From 1883 to 1885 Rozhestensky was seconded to the newly formed Bulgarian Navy.  He also designed a defense plan for the Bulgarian coastline, and was one of the founders of the Technology Association of Bulgaria.

Rozhestvensky returned to Russian service and was senior officer on the battery ship Kreml and the cruiser . He then commanded the clipper Naezdnik and gunboat Grozyachiy. From 1891 to 1893 he was naval attaché to London. From 1896 to 1898 he commanded the coast defence ship Pervenets. In 1898 he was promoted to rear admiral and became commander of the gunnery school of the Baltic Fleet. In 1902 he was appointed Chief of the Naval Staff and proposed a plan for strengthening the Imperial Russian Navy in the Far East.

Russo-Japanese War

Prior to the war against Japan starting in 1904, Rozhestvensky was commander of the Baltic Fleet. Tsar Nicholas II ordered Rozhestvensky to take the Baltic Fleet to East Asia to protect the Russian naval base of Port Arthur. The Tsar had selected the right man for the job, for it would take an iron-fisted commander to sail an untested fleet of brand new battleships (for some of the new Borodinos, this voyage was their shakedown cruise) and new untrained sailors on the longest coal-powered battleship fleet voyage in recorded history. Rozhestvensky had a fiery temper when dealing with a subordinate, and both officers and men knew to stand clear of "Mad Dog" when a subordinate either disobeyed orders, was incompetent, or both.

Rozhestvensky was fully aware that he had a new untrained fleet under his command and that re-coaling stations would not be available during the journey, due to Britain's alliance with Japan; and that both the shakedown testing of the new battleships and the gunnery practice/training would have to occur during the voyage. Also, re-coaling would have to be done at sea, instead of in port as with most other navies.  As a consequence of these circumstances, the mission-minded commander would sometimes fire service ammunition (live gunfire) across the bows of an errant warship, and in a fiery moment fling his binoculars from the bridge into the sea.  When his battleship fleet set sail in 1904, Rozhestvensky's staff ensured that his flagship, Knyaz Suvorov, had a good supply of binoculars on board.

Nevertheless, the inexperience of the Russian Baltic Fleet almost triggered a war between Russia and Great Britain as it sailed through the North Sea. After several Russian ships mistook British fishing trawlers at Dogger Bank for torpedo boats from the Imperial Japanese Navy, they opened fire on the unarmed civilian vessels. The Dogger Bank incident on the night of 21–22 October 1904 resulted in the deaths of three British fishermen and many wounded. One sailor and a priest aboard a Russian cruiser were also killed in the crossfire.

The Russian government agreed to investigate the incident following a great deal of international diplomatic pressure. Rozhestvensky was ordered to dock in Vigo, Spain, while battleships of the Royal Navy from the British Home Fleet were prepared for war. Several British cruiser squadrons shadowed Rozhestvensky's fleet as it made its way through the Bay of Biscay. On arrival in Spain, Rozhestvensky left behind those officers he considered responsible for the incident (as well as at least one officer who had been critical of him). On November 25, 1904, the British and the Russian governments signed a joint agreement in which they agreed to submit the issue to an International Commission of Inquiry at The Hague. On February 26, 1905, the commission published its report. It criticized Rozhestvensky for allowing his ships to fire upon the British ships, but noted that "as each [Russian] vessel swept the horizon in every direction with her searchlights to avoid being taken by surprise, it was difficult to prevent confusion". The report also concluded that once the mistake was known "Admiral Rozhestvensky personally did everything he could, from beginning to end of the incident, to prevent [the trawlers] from being fired upon by the squadron". Russia eventually paid £66,000 (£5.8m today) in compensation.

Rozhestvensky believed from the start that the plan to send the Baltic Fleet to Port Arthur was ill-conceived, and vehemently opposed plans to include a motley collection of obsolete vessels, the Third Pacific Squadron to his fleet (referred to by the Admiral and his staff as the 'self-sinkers'), to the extent of refusing to reveal to the Admiralty his exact routing from Madagascar and to share his battle plan with Third Pacific Squadron commander Nikolai Nebogatov. Remote and distrustful of his staff, Rozhestvensky grew increasingly bitter and pessimistic as he approached Asia.
Almost as soon as the Baltic Fleet arrived in the Far East in May 1905, it was engaged by the Japanese Navy at the decisive Battle of Tsushima (27–28 May 1905).

Battle of Tsushima
Japanese Admiral Tōgō Heihachirō drew upon his experiences from the battles of Port Arthur and the Yellow Sea, and this time would not split his fires nor engage Rozhestvensky at excessive ranges, as he had done with Admiral Vitgeft at the Battle of the Yellow Sea the year previously. He would instead, with the proper use of reconnaissance vessels and wireless communications position his battle fleet in such a way as to "preserve his interior lines of movement", which would allow him to have shorter distances to cover while causing Rozhestvensky to have longer distances to travel, regardless of battleship speeds.

Naval intelligence had already informed Togo of Rozhestvensky's mission, that of reaching Vladivostok, and avoiding contact with the Japanese navy if at all possible, and fighting as little as possible, if forced into it.  Rozhestvensky's objective was to reinforce the Vladivostok Squadron, and then, when the Russian navy felt sufficiently prepared, they would engage the Japanese navy in a decisive action.

With this knowledge in possession, Togo planned on preempting the Russian plan, by positioning his battle fleet to "bring the Russian fleet to battle, regardless of the speed of either battlefleet."  Admiral Togo was able to appear directly across Rozhestvensky's line of advance (Rozhestvensky's T had been crossed).  With only most of his bow guns to use, Rozhestvensky's main batteries were "thrown successively out of bearing" as he continued to advance.  Other than surrender or retreat, Rozhestvensky had but two choices; fight a pitched battle or charge Togo's battleline. He chose the former, and by the evening of 27 May 1905, Rozhestvensky's flagship and the majority of his fleet were on the bottom of the Tsushima Straits. The Russians had lost 5,000 sailors.

During the battle, Rozhestvensky was wounded in the head by a shell fragment. The unconscious admiral was transferred to the destroyer Buinii and subsequently to the destroyer Bedovii. He was taken prisoner when the ship was later captured by the Imperial Japanese Navy. After the signing of the Treaty of Portsmouth he returned to St Petersburg via the Trans-Siberian Railway.
The victorious Admiral Tōgō would later visit him (while being treated for his injuries in a Japanese hospital), comforting him with kind words:

Aftermath
In 1906, Rozhestvensky faced court-martial for the disaster, along with each of his surviving battleship commanders. Some faced prison and some the firing squad for either losing the battle or surrendering on the high seas. The Tsar's court was fully aware that Admiral Nikolai Nebogatov had surrendered the Russian fleet, as Rozhestvensky had been wounded and unconscious for most of the battle, and was very reluctant to accept his statements of responsibility. Nonetheless, Rozhestvensky was adamant in his defense of his subordinate commanders and maintained total responsibility, pleading guilty to losing the battle.  As was expected (and hoped) by the courts, the Tsar commuted the death-sentenced captains to short prison terms and pardons for the remaining officers.

Later life
Rozhestvensky lived out the last years of his life in St Petersburg as a recluse. He died of a heart attack in 1909 and was buried in the Alexander Nevsky Lavra.

Awards
  Order of St. George, 4th class
  Order of St. Vladimir, 3rd class and 4th class with ribbon
  Order of St. Anna, 2nd and 3rd classes
  Order of St. Stanislav, 1st, 2nd and 3rd classes

See also
 Nikolai Kolomeitsev

Notes

References
 Busch, Noel F. The Emperor's Sword.  (1969) Funk & Wagnalls, New York. 
 Corbett, Sir Julian. Maritime Operations In The Russo-Japanese War 1904–1905. (1994) Originally classified (unavailable to the public), and in two volumes.  .
 Corbett, Sir Julian. "Maritime Operations In The Russo-Japanese War 1904-1905."  Volume I (2015) Originally published January 1914. Naval Institute Press 
 Corbett, Sir Julian. "Maritime Operations In The Russo-Japanese War 1904-1905."  Volume II (2015) Originally published October 1915. Naval Institute Press 
 Forczyk, Robert.  Russian Battleship vs Japanese Battleship, Yellow Sea 1904–05. (2009), Osprey; .
 Friedman, Norman. Naval Firepower, Battleship Guns and Gunnery in the Dreadnaught Era. (2013) Seaforth Publishing; 
 Grant, R., Captain, D.S.O. Before Port Arthur in a Destroyer; The Personal Diary of a Japanese Naval Officer. (1907).  London, John Murray, Albemarle St. W.
 Hough, Richard, A. The Fleet That Had To Die.  New York, Ballantine Books. (1960).
 
 Mahan, Alfred Thayer. Reflections, Historic and Other, Suggested by the Battle of the Japan Sea. By Captain A. T. Mahan, U.S. Navy.  US Naval Proceedings magazine, June 1906; Volume XXXVI, No. 2. US Naval Institute.
 Novikov-Priboy, Alexey. Tsushima.  (1936) London: George Allen & Unwin Ltd
 Pleshakov, Constantine. The Tsar's Last Armada: Epic Voyage to the Battle of Tsushima . (2002). .
 Seager, Robert.  Alfred Thayer Mahan: The Man And His Letters.  (1977) .
 Semenoff, Vladimir, Capt. Rasplata (The Reckoning). (1910). London: John Murray.
 Semenoff, Vladimir, Capt. The Battle of Tsushima. (1912). NY E.P. Dutton & Co.
 Staff, Gary. Skagerrak, The Battle of Jutland Through German Eyes." (2016) 
 Tomitch, V. M. "Warships of the Imperial Russian Navy." Volume 1, Battleships. (1968).
 Warner, Denis and Peggy. "The Tide at Sunrise, A History of the Russo-Japanese War 1904–1905."  (1975).  
 Watts, Anthony J. The Imperial Russian Navy.'' Arms and Armour, Villiers House, 41–47 Strand, London; 1990.  .

1848 births
1909 deaths
Imperial Russian Navy admirals
Russian military personnel of the Russo-Turkish War (1877–1878)
Russian military personnel of the Russo-Japanese War
Recipients of the Order of St. Vladimir, 3rd class
Recipients of the Order of St. Anna, 2nd class
Baltic Fleet
Russian naval attachés
Burials at Tikhvin Cemetery
Naval Cadet Corps alumni